The Chinatown West Gate is installed in Los Angeles' Chinatown neighborhood, in the U.S. state of California.

Installed in 1938, the structure exhibits traditional Chinese design and displays characters which translate to "Cooperate to Achieve". The gate has 150-year-old camphor wood from China. After being nominated by the Los Angeles Conservancy, the West Gate was designated a Los Angeles Historic-Cultural Monument, No. 825.

See also

 Chinese architecture
 History of Chinese Americans in Los Angeles
 List of Los Angeles Historic-Cultural Monuments in Downtown Los Angeles

External links

References

1938 establishments in California
Buildings and structures in Los Angeles
Chinatown, Los Angeles
Gates in the United States
Outdoor sculptures in Greater Los Angeles